Acacia caesaneura, commonly known as western blue mulga, is a shrub or tree belonging to the genus Acacia and the subgenus Juliflorae that is endemic to western Australia.

Description
The densely haired branchlets have discrete resinous ribs towards the apices. Like most species of Acacia it has phyllodes rather than true leaves. The evergreen and variable phyllodes are straight and dimidiate to sickle shaped recurved and usually with a narrowly oblong to elliptic shape.

Distribution
It is native to an area of the Goldfields-Esperance and Mid West regions of Western Australia. The bulk of the population is found from around Yalgoo in the west to around Meekatharra in the north down to around Kalgoorlie in the south extending to around the northern edge of the Nullarbor Plain in the east. A. caesaneura if often situated on plains or undulating country growing in red-brown sandy loam to clay soils sometimes over hardpan as a part of Acacia shrubland or woodland communities.

See also
List of Acacia species

References

caesaneura
Acacias of Western Australia
Taxa named by Bruce Maslin
Plants described in 2012